Ronald Anthony Phillips  (born 16 May 1949) is a former Australian politician, elected as a member of the New South Wales Legislative Assembly.

Phillips was born in Sydney and became accountant in the dairy, printing, mining, rubber plastics and stockbroking industries. He worked for Potter Partners, a stockbroking firm, for three years before his election to Parliament.  He married Ann-Marie and they had one daughter and two sons.  He represented the seat of Miranda for the Liberal Party from 1984 to 1999.  He was Minister for Health Services Management from June 1991 until June 1992 and then Minister for Health until the defeat of the Fahey government in March 1995.  He was then Deputy Leader of the Opposition until he lost his seat in 1999.

Phillips was appointed an Officer of the Order of Australia for distinguished service to community health and to the Parliament of New South Wales.

References

 

1949 births
Living people
Members of the New South Wales Legislative Assembly
Liberal Party of Australia members of the Parliament of New South Wales
Officers of the Order of Australia